The Sawdust Ring (also known as The Little Equestrienne) is a 1917 American silent drama film distributed by the Triangle Film Corporation and starring Bessie Love. A shortened version of the film survives in 9.5 mm reduction print at Cineteca Nazionale, Pacific Film Archive, and the BFI National Archive. The film has also been released, in its shortened version, by Harpodeon.

Plot 

Two children who want to become circus performers run away from home. The mother of the girl is ill and has been sent to the hospital, while the father of the boy is a junk dealer. They finally arrive at the circus of Colonel Simmonds (Richardson) and obtain employment. When Janet Magie (Love) falls from a horse, Simmonds learns that she is actually his daughter and through her is able to contact his wife, who had left him due to a misunderstanding. This results in a happy reunion.

Cast 
 Bessie Love as Janet Magie
 Harold Goodwin as Peter Weldon
 Jack Richardson as Colonel Simmonds
 Josephine Headley as Mrs. Magie
 Daisy Dean as Paquita
 Alfred Hollingsworth as Steve Weldon

References

External links 

 
 
 
 

1917 drama films
1917 films
American black-and-white films
Silent American drama films
American silent feature films
Films directed by Paul Powell (director)
Surviving American silent films
Triangle Film Corporation films
Films directed by Charles Miller
1910s American films